Angle Lake is a lake in Alberta, Canada, located in County of Two Hills No. 21.

Angle Lake was named for the fact the lake's shape forms an angle.

See also
List of lakes of Alberta

References

Lakes of Alberta